Marysville is an unincorporated community and census-designated place (CDP) in Lewis and Clark County, Montana, United States. Elevation is 5,413 ft (1,650 m).

Demographics

History
Marysville was a bustling mining town of 3,000 residents in the 1880s and 1890s and was the center of gold mining in Montana. The town was named by Thomas Cruse, mine owner, to honor Mary Ralston the wife of a miner. A few buildings remain, including a baseball field with bleachers and the historic Methodist-Episcopal Church of Marysville. The population as of the 2010 census was 80.

Geography and Location
Marysville is in southwestern Lewis and Clark County,  by road northwest of Helena, the state capital. It is in the valley of Silver Creek, which flows east into the Helena Valley and joins the Missouri River. West of the town is the Great Divide Ski Area on the eastern and northern slopes of  Mount Belmont, while down the road to the east is the Silver City Saloon on Highway 279. It is very close to the Great Divide ski area, and you can ski from late November to March.

Mining revival

In 2010, there were news reports stating that recent exploration of the richest gold mine in the area, the Drumlummon Mine, had led to possible new discoveries. Its lower levels were allowed to flood when the mine was closed in 1904 during litigation. Sentiment in the town is mixed regarding possible resumption of extensive mining operations.

Lore

Much of the lore in Marysville was centered on one Irishman, "Irish Tommy" Cruse. He came to the area to look for gold but would return with an empty poke and a smile. He didn't have much money and often slept in a bar counter in Helena. One day, in a site near present-day Marysville, he hit it rich. He named the site Drumlummon, after his birthplace in Ireland, and founded Marysville. Some believe it was named so because the first person there was a Mary Ralston. Others believed it was for the first three Marys there. Another said it was after one of Tommy's associates. Tommy got $150,000 before selling it for $1,500,000.

Notes

External links
Marysville at former Hometown Locator website (archived)
Marysville House homepage

Unincorporated communities in Montana
Unincorporated communities in Lewis and Clark County, Montana
Ghost towns in Montana
Populated places established in 1876
1876 establishments in Montana Territory